Duke John Albert of Mecklenburg (given names John Albert Ernest Constantine Frederick Henry; 8 December 1857 – 16 February 1920) was a member of the House of Mecklenburg-Schwerin who served as the regent of two states of the German Empire. He was first regent of the Grand Duchy of Mecklenburg-Schwerin from 1897 to 1901 for his nephew Frederick Francis IV, Grand Duke of Mecklenburg, and thereafter regent of the Duchy of Brunswick from 1907 to 1913.

Birth and interests
Duke John Albert of Mecklenburg was born in Schwerin the fifth child of Frederick Francis II, Grand Duke of Mecklenburg and his first wife Princess Augusta Reuss of Köstritz (1822–1862). Duke John Albert was educated in Dresden, pursued a career in the Prussian Army and was well known for his love of sports. He also developed an interest in Germany's colonial empire, co-founding the Pan-German League and becoming president of the German Colonial Society in 1895.

Regencies

Following the death of his brother Frederick Francis III, Grand Duke of Mecklenburg on 10 April 1897, Duke John Albert was appointed regent for his young nephew the new Grand Duke, Frederick Francis IV after his older brother Duke Paul Frederick had renounced his claim to the regency. He ruled as regent until his nephew came of age on 9 April 1901 when he assumed personal control of the Grand Duchy.

On 28 May 1907, Duke John Albert was elected regent of the Duchy of Brunswick following the death of Prince Albert of Prussia by the state's diet, accepting the offer he arrived in Brunswick on 5 June 1907. The reason for the regency in Brunswick was that in 1884 when William, Duke of Brunswick died his distant cousin and heir Ernest Augustus, Crown Prince of Hanover was prevented from taking over the duchy because he refused to renounce his claim to the throne of the Kingdom of Hanover which had been annexed by Prussia in 1866.

Shortly after assuming the regency, Duke John Albert would walk Brunswick in civilian clothes visiting museums, libraries and other institutions in the duchy, asking questions of people to discover their living conditions. After he became too well known to walk unnoticed he established a weekly audience where people could go and present a petition to him. Duke John Albert also cut down on the expenses of the royal household by cutting the number of servants and retainers to the minimum needed to run the household.

The regency came to an end on 1 November 1913 when Ernest Augustus, Crown Prince of Hanover's son Ernest Augustus was permitted to ascend to Duchy following his marriage to Princess Victoria Louise of Prussia the only daughter of the German Emperor William II which helped heal the rift between the houses of Hanover and Hohenzollern.

War years
During the First World War Duke John Albert was active with the German Colonial Society in defending the Germany's colonial possessions from suggestions that they should be abandoned. On 2 September 1917 he was appointed honorary chairman of the pro war Fatherland Party.

Duke John Albert died in 1920 in Wiligrad castle near Lübstorf aged 62.

Marriages
John Albert was married twice firstly in Weimar on 6 November 1886 to Princess Elisabeth Sybille of Saxe-Weimar-Eisenach (1854–1908) the daughter of Charles Alexander, Grand Duke of Saxe-Weimar-Eisenach. He was married secondly in Brunswick on 15 December 1909 to Princess Elisabeth of Stolberg-Rossla (1885–1969), who would following his death marry his half brother Duke Adolf Friedrich in 1924. Both of John Albert's marriages were childless.

Ojimukoka 
Ojimukoka, a small settlement, postoffice and railway station in Namibia, was renamed Johann - Albrechtshöhe, and then simply Albrechts in his honour.

Honours
German decorations

Foreign decorations

Ancestry

References

External links
 

1857 births
1920 deaths
People from Schwerin
Dukes of Mecklenburg-Schwerin
House of Mecklenburg-Schwerin
German Fatherland Party politicians
Regents of Germany
Generals of Cavalry (Prussia)
Recipients of the Order of the Rising Sun with Paulownia Flowers
Recipients of the Order of the Netherlands Lion
Sons of monarchs